Liesel Schwarz is a British steampunk author, often referred to as "The High Priestess of British Steampunk". She was born in South Africa.

Works
 The Chronicles of Light and Shadow
 A Conspiracy of Alchemists
 A Clockwork Heart
 Sky Pirates

References

External links

Living people
Year of birth missing (living people)
British women novelists